Lewis Peak can refer to

 Lewis Peak (Alaska), a peak in the Alaska Range
 Lewis Peak (Montana), a peak in Central Montana
 Lewis Peak (Nevada), a peak in the Shoshone Range of Nevada, near Mount Lewis
 Lewis Peak (New Mexico), a peak in the Guadalupe Mountains of New Mexico
 Lewis Peak (Utah), a peak in the Wasatch Range of Utah
 Lewis Peak (Virginia), a peak in the Shenandoah Mountains of Virginia
 Lewis Peak (Blue Mountains) in the Blue Mountains of Washington
 Lewis Peak (Cascade Range) in the Cascade Range of Washington
 Lewis Peaks in Graham Land, Antarctica
 Dave Lewis Peak in Idaho